Isachsen was an Arctic weather station.

Isachsen may also refer to:
Andreas Isachsen (1829–1903), Norwegian actor and playwright
Gunnar Isachsen (1868–1939), Norwegian military officer and polar scientist
Herbert Isachsen, a Knight's Cross of the Iron Cross

See also